NRP João de Lisboa was a 2nd class sloop (or aviso) of the Portuguese Navy. She was designed to operate in the Overseas territories of Portugal.

Its name was given in honor of the Portuguese explorer and cartographer João de Lisboa. It became a research vessel from 1961 until 1966.

References

Naval ships of Portugal
1936 ships